Parodia chrysacanthion, the golden powder puff, is a species of cactus in the genus Parodia, native to northwest Argentina. It has gained the Royal Horticultural Society's Award of Garden Merit.

References

chrysacanthion
Endemic flora of Argentina
Flora of Northwest Argentina
Plants described in 1935